USS Alice may refer to the following ships of the United States Navy:

 , was a screw tug purchased by the Navy on 25 July 1864 and renamed Aster before being placed in commission.
 , was a harbor tug. The vessel was at Norfolk Navy Yard in December 1905
 

United States Navy ship names